João Miguel Ferraz (born 8 January 1990) is a Portuguese handball player for HSC Suhr Aarau and the Portuguese national team.

He represented Portugal at the 2020 European Men's Handball Championship.

References

External links

1990 births
Living people
Portuguese male handball players
Sportspeople from Funchal
Expatriate handball players
Portuguese expatriate sportspeople in Germany
Portuguese expatriate sportspeople in Switzerland
FC Porto handball players
HSG Wetzlar players
Handball-Bundesliga players
Handball players at the 2020 Summer Olympics